The eighth series of the Ojarumaru anime series aired from April 4 to December 2, 2005 on NHK for a total of 90 episodes. The series' opening theme is "Utahito" (詠人) by Saburō Kitajima. The ending theme is "Gekkō Machi no Uta" (月光町のうた Moonlight Town's Song) by Chinami Nishimura and Yūji Ueda.

Episodes

References

External links
 Series 8 episode list

Ojarumaru episode lists